Longwood and Milnsbridge railway station is a former railway station serving the Longwood and Milnsbridge areas of Huddersfield in West Yorkshire, England that was located between the existing Huddersfield and Slaithwaite stations.  It closed on 6 October 1968 (along with many other wayside stations on the Huddersfield to Manchester line) as a result of the Beeching Axe.

References

External links
 Longwood and Milnsbridge station on navigable 1947 O. S. map

Disused railway stations in Kirklees
Former London and North Western Railway stations
Railway stations in Great Britain opened in 1849
Railway stations in Great Britain closed in 1968
Beeching closures in England